Cocoseae is a tribe of cocosoid palms of the family Arecaceae.

Description
The fruit of the Cocoseae is a modified drupe, with a sclerenchymatous epicarp and a highly developed mesocarp, formed mainly by parenchyma . The endocarp is generally sclerenchymatous and protects the seeds from predation and drying. The most obvious synapomorphy of the species of this tribe is the presence, in the endocarp, of three or more "eyes" or pores of germination.

Distribution
The Cocoseae are distributed mainly in the Neotropical regions, with two genera endemic to Africa (Jubaeopsis and Elaeis) and Madagascar ( Beccariophoenix and Voanioala ), respectively.

Systematics
The Cocoseae in the sense of Dransfield et al. (2008) are identified as natural relatives (Monophylum) in most studies. Their systematic position within the Arecoideae is still unclear. Different studies see them as a sister group of the Reinhardtieae, as a sister group of the group from Reinhardtieae and Roystoneeae, or as a sister group of the Oranieae.

The Tribe is divided into three sub-tribes. All three are monophyletic. Bactridinae and Elaeidinae are sister groups

Genera

References

External links
 
 

 
Monocot tribes